Nationality words link to articles with information on the nation's poetry or literature (for instance, Irish or France).

Events
 Simwnt Fychan appointed "pencerdd", or senior bard, by Elizabeth I of England
 Siôn Phylip ordained as a master poet at the second Eisteddfod in Caerwys

Works published

England
 Thomas Drant, Epigrams and Sentences Spirituall in Vers, translated from St. Gregory Nazianzus
 Thomas Howell (poet), The Arbor of Amitie
 John Skelton, Pithy Pleasaunt and Profitable Workes of Maister Skelton, edited by J. Stow; published posthumously (died 1529) by Thomas Marshe
 George Turberville, A Plaine Path to Perfect Vertue, translation of Dominic Mancini's De quatour virtutibus

Other
François d'Amboise, Élégie sur le trépas d'Anne de Montmorency, France
 Petar Hektorović, Ribanje i ribarsko prigovaranje ("Fishing and Fishermen's Talk"), three-part pastoral and philosophic narrative poem written in Croatian and published in Venice

Births
Death years link to the corresponding "[year] in poetry" article:
 February 2 – Peter Révay (died 1622), Hungarian poet, nobleman, Royal Crown Guard for the Holy Crown of Hungary, state official, soldier and historian
 March 30 – Henry Wotton (died 1639), English diplomat, author and poet
 September 3 – Adriano Banchieri (died 1634), Italian composer, music theorist, organist and poet
 September 5 – Tommaso Campanella (died 1639), philosopher and poet
 Also:
 Yuan Hongdao (died 1610), Chinese poet of the Ming Dynasty and one of the Three Yuan Brothers
 Gervase Markham, birth year uncertain (died 1637), English poet and writer

Deaths
Birth years link to the corresponding "[year] in poetry" article:
 September 14 – Jan van Casembroot (born 1525), South Holland noble and poet
 December 23 – Roger Ascham (born c. 1515), English scholar,  didactic writer and poet; died from a chill contracted when staying up all night to finish a New Year's Day poem for Queen Elizabeth I, whom he had tutored
 Abderrahman El Majdoub (born unknown), Berber Moroccan poet
 Antoine Héroet (born unknown), French philosopher, theologian, astrologer and poet
 Luigi Tansillo (born 1510), Italian poet of Petrarchan sonnets and Marinist style

See also

 Poetry
 16th century in poetry
 16th century in literature
 Dutch Renaissance and Golden Age literature
 Elizabethan literature
 French Renaissance literature
 Renaissance literature
 Spanish Renaissance literature

Notes

16th-century poetry
Poetry